Argentina is a predominantly Christian country, with Islam being a minority religion. Due to secular nature of the Argentine constitution, Muslims are free to proselytize and build places of worship in the country. 

Although accurate statistics on religion are not available (because the national census does not solicit religious data), the actual size of Argentina's Muslim community is estimated to be around 1% of the total population (400,000 to 500,000 members), according to the International Religious Freedom Report in 2015.

Early Muslim immigration 
There are some indications that the Muslim presence within present day Argentinian territory dates back to the time of the Spanish exploration and conquest. The first mentioned Muslim settlers were the 15th century's Moorish-Morisco (Muslims of the Iberian peninsula of  North African and Spanish descent) who explored the Americas with Spanish explorers, many of them settling in Argentina who were fleeing from persecution in Spain such as the Spanish Inquisition.

However, in the 19th century Argentina saw the first real wave of Arabs to settle within its territory, mostly from Syria and Lebanon. It is estimated that today there are about 3.5 million Argentinians of Arab descent, most of whom are Christian.

Islamic institutions in Argentina

The first two mosques in the country were built in Buenos Aires in the 80s: At-Tauhid Mosque was opened in 1983 by the shia community of Buenos Aires and with the support of the Embassy of the Islamic Republic of Iran to Argentina, while Al Ahmad Mosque was opened in 1985 for the sunni Muslims and is the first building with Islamic architecture in the country. There are also several mosques in other cities and regions throughout the country, including two in Córdoba, two in Mar del Plata and the southernmost Sufi mosque in the world, in El Bolsón.

The King Fahd Islamic Cultural Centre, the largest mosque in Argentina, was completed in 1996 with the help of the Custodian of the Two Holy Mosques, the then King of Saudi Arabia, Fahd, on a piece of land measuring 20,000 m². The total land area granted by the Argentine government measures 34,000 m², and was offered by President Carlos Menem following his visit to Saudi Arabia in 1992. The project cost around US$30 million, and includes a mosque, library, two schools, a park, is located in the middle-class district of Palermo, Buenos Aires.

The Islamic Organization of Latin America (IOLA), headquartered in Argentina, is considered the most active organization in Latin America in promoting Islamic affiliated endeavors. The IOLA holds events to promote the unification of Muslims living in Latin America, as well as the propagation of Islam.

See also
 Arab Argentines
 Religion in Argentina
 List of mosques in Argentina
Morisco
Mudéjar
Moors

References

Further reading
 KUSUMO, Fitra Ismu, "ISLAM EN AMERICA LATINA Tomo I: La expansión del Islam y su llegada a América Latina (Spanish Edition)"
 KUSUMO, Fitra Ismu, "ISLAM EN AMÉRICA LATINA Tomo II: Migración Árabe a América Latina y el caso de México (Spanish Edition)" 
 KUSUMO, Fitra Ismu, "ISLAM EN AMÉRICA LATINA Tomo III: El Islam hoy desde América Latina (Spanish Edition)"

External links 

 Islam in the Americas by Florida International University research-led team

 
Argentina